The 2005–06 Serie B is the 74th season since its establishment in 1929. It is the second highest football league in Italy.

Teams 
Cremonese, Rimini, Mantova and Avellino had been promoted from Serie C, while Bologna, Brescia and Atalanta had been relegated from Serie A.

Final classification

Results

Play-off

Promotion play-off 
hc = higher classified team in the regular season

Semifinals

Finals

Relegation play-off

Topscorers

External links 
 2005/2006 Serie B Squads - (www.footballsquads.co.uk)

Serie B seasons
2005–06 in Italian football leagues
Italy